Telopea  is a suburb of Greater Western Sydney, in the state of New South Wales, Australia. Telopea is located 23 kilometres north-west of the Sydney central business district, in the local government area of the City of Parramatta. The suburb is bordered by Kissing Point Road to the south and Pennant Hills Road to the north.

Name
Telopea is named from Telopea speciosissima, the New South Wales waratah, a plant that was abundant in the area before it was colonized and which became the floral emblem of New South Wales.

Transport
The area is serviced by Busways bus route 545

Telopea railway station was on the Carlingford railway line of the Sydney Trains network. The conversion of the Camellia to Carlingford section of the Carlingford railway line to light rail was announced in 2015 as part of the Parramatta Light Rail project and the station closed 5 January 2020. The station area is now served by temporary bus route 535 between Carlingford and Parramatta.

Commercial area
Waratah Shopping Centre, located on Benaud Place, has many retail shops including a Liquorland, newsagent, chemist, kebab shop, post office, bakery and a hair and beauty salon. A small group of shops is also located opposite the railway station on Adderton Road.

Housing
Telopea is mainly low to low-medium density housing with most of the dwellings having been built after World War II. The suburb is bisected by the Carlingford railway line with most of the medium-density housing lying adjacent to the train line.

Parks
Telopea contains a large tract of bushland on its western edge, backing onto the Oatlands golf course. The bushland, the Vineyard Creek Reserve as it is known contains a spring-fed creek and has several waterfalls on its course before it disappears beneath Kissing Point road to the south. The creek and the bushland are protected as environmental areas.

Places of worship
 The local Anglican Church meets in Telopea on Saturday evenings and at Dundas on Sundays.
 Telopea Christian Centre is another local Church.

Community facilities
Local facilities include a primary school, an alternative educational facility, a library, community hall and a community garden.

Heritage listings
Telopea has a number of heritage-listed sites, including:
 34 Adderton Road: Redstone

Population
Of these: 
 The age distribution was quite similar to the country in general. The median age was 38 years, identical to the national median. Children aged 0–14 years made up 17.8% of the population (national average is 18.7%) and people aged 65 years and over made up 14.0% of the population (national average is 15.8%).
 46.0% of people were born in Australia. The most common countries of birth were China 14.8%, South Korea 7.2%, Lebanese/Iran 33%, and Hong Kong 2.2%. 40.7% of people only spoke English at home. Other languages spoken at home included Mandarin 14.3%, Korean 9.9%, Cantonese 9.0%, Arabic 17.6% and Persian 12.4%.
 The most common responses for religion were No Religion 30.7%, Catholic 18.6% and Anglican 8.6%.

References

External links

Suburbs of Sydney
City of Parramatta